Adelson is a surname. Notable people with the surname include:

 Edward H. Adelson, American neuroscientist
 Jake Adelson, Australian professional footballer
 Jay Adelson, American Internet entrepreneur
 Merv Adelson, American real estate developer and television producer who co-founded Lorimar Television
 Andrew Adelson, American television producer, son of Merv Adelson, spouse of Orly
 Orly Adelson, American Israeli television producer, spouse of Andrew
 Gary Adelson, American television producer, son of Merv Adelson
 Steven A. Adelson, American film director and television director
 Michael Adelson, American orchestral conductor
 Miriam Adelson, Israeli American philanthropist and doctor, spouse of Sheldon Adelson
 Sheldon Adelson, American casino magnate, spouse of Miriam Adelson
 Tom Adelson, American politician
 Warren Adelson, American art dealer, art historian, and author

See also 
 Adelson e Salvini, opera by Vincenzo Bellini
 Adelson Foundation, founded by Sheldon and Miriam Adelson
 Adelsohn
 David Adleson, American music journalist
 Georgy Adelson-Velsky, Soviet and Israeli mathematician and computer scientist
 Shirley Adelson Siegel (1918-2020), American lawyer

Jewish surnames